Moonlight Waltz Tour 2011 is a live CD and DVD from the Italian gothic metal band Theatres des Vampires. It is the first all-in-one live CD and DVD release from the band, though Theatres des Vampires have released one live CD (Desire of Damnation) and one live DVD (The Addiction Tour 2006), separately. In addition to the live tracks, the CD contains three new studio songs from The Cult of Lamia soundtrack. The limited edition package also includes a 40-page book.

Track listing 
CD

DVD

The DVD also contains a trailer and behind the scenes of "Cult of Lamia".

Personnel 

Sonya Scarlet − vocals
Fabian Varesi − keyboards and backing vocals
Gabriel Valerio − drums and percussions
Zimon Lijoi − bass guitar and backing vocals
Stephan Benfante − guitars and backing vocals

References 

Theatres des Vampires albums
2012 live albums
2012 video albums
Live video albums